Saarikoski is a Finnish surname. Notable people with the surname include:

Atlas Saarikoski (born 1982), Finnish social activist, journalist and anarchist
Felix Saarikoski (1857–1920), Finnish politician
Pentti Saarikoski (1937–1983), Finnish poet and translator

Finnish-language surnames